Puma (Puma: पुमा Pumā) is a Kiranti language spoken by about 4,310 people (Central Bureau of Statistics report 2001) in Sagarmatha Zone, Nepal. The actual population may be somewhat higher. The same term ‘Puma’ refers both to the people and the language they speak [Sharma 2014].

The Himalayan Languages Project has produced the first grammatical sketch of Puma. Like other Kiranti languages, Puma has a maximum syllable form of (C) (G) V (C) (C) for open syllables and (N) C V C for closed syllables, where ‘G’ is a glide and ‘N’ is a nasal (Sharma 2014:92].

Locations
Puma is spoken in Diplung, Mauwabote, Devisthan, Pauwasera, and Chisapani VDC's of southern Khotang District, and in Beltar and Saunechour VDC's of Udayapur District, Nepal. It is also spoken in Ruwa Khola valley to Buwa Khola, and southward across the Dudh Koshi.

Education
Puma language is taught in 14 schools of Barahapokhari and Jantedhunga Rural Municipalities of Khotang district in Nepal since 2020.

References

Bibliography
Sharma, Narayan Prasad. "Morphosyntax of Puma, a Tibeto-Burman language of Nepal." PhD diss., SOAS, University of London, 2014. https://eprints.soas.ac.uk/18554/1/Sharma_3615.pdf

External links
The Chintang and Puma Documentation Project (DoBeS)
ELAR archive of Documentation of Puma

Kiranti languages
Languages of Koshi Province